David Hayes (born 1953) is  Canadian feature writer, author, editor and teacher. He has written three nonfiction books and frequently works as a ghost/co-writer or substantive editor. His articles, essays and reviews have appeared in many publications, among them Saturday Night, Report on Business, The Globe and Mail, Reader's Digest, The New York Times Magazine, TORO, The Walrus, Chatelaine, enRoute, Toronto Life (he was the magazine's media columnist in the late 1980s), and National Post Business (he served as senior writer from August 2001 until April 2003). He has won nine National Magazine Awards (Gold, Silver and Honourable Mentions) and, in 2009, an Amnesty International Media Award for a feature on refugee children abandoned at Canadian airports, published in Chatelaine.

He began teaching in the School of Journalism at Toronto's Ryerson University (now Toronto Metropolitan University) in the late 1980s. He was an assistant professor on faculty there from 1995 to 2002. At that time, he returned to full-time journalism and taught Advanced Feature Writing in Toronto Metropolitan University's G. Raymond Chang School of Continuing Studies from 2003 to 2018. He now serves on faculty of the University of King's College's Master of Fine Arts (MFA) in Creative Nonfiction.

He gives workshops, lectures and appears on panels relating to feature writing, researching, reporting, and interviewing techniques and other aspects of journalism.

References

Academic staff of Toronto Metropolitan University
Canadian non-fiction writers
Living people
1953 births